Rex Brobby (born 21 February 1958) is a Ghanaian sprinter. He competed in the men's 4 × 100 metres relay at the 1984 Summer Olympics.

References

1958 births
Living people
Athletes (track and field) at the 1984 Summer Olympics
Ghanaian male sprinters
Olympic athletes of Ghana
Place of birth missing (living people)